Joel Lewis Parsons (born 24 July 1985 in Broken Hill, New South Wales, Australia) is a professional speedway rider.

Career history
Parsons was a member of the treble winning Hull Vikings team that won the Premier League, the KO Cup and the Young Shield in 2004.

References 

1985 births
Living people
Australian speedway riders
Belle Vue Aces riders
Newport Wasps riders
Sheffield Tigers riders
Hull Vikings riders
Swindon Robins riders
Wimbledon Dons riders
People from Broken Hill, New South Wales
Sportsmen from New South Wales